Vangelis Platellas (born 1 December 1988) is a Greek professional footballer who plays as a winger for Super League club Ionikos.

Club career
Vangelis Platellas began playing professional football for Football League side Kallithea, and then transferred on 2 January 2012 to Super league side Skoda Xanthi.

AEK Athens
In the summer of 2013, Platellas signed with AEK Athens. In the 2013–14 season, Platellas made 25 appearances scoring 15 goals. On 29 August 2014 he scored in a 4–0 home win against Fokikos for the Greek Cup. On 30 November 2014, he scored after three months in a 3–1 away win against Panachaiki. One week later, he scored in a 7–0 home win against Episkopi. On 17 December 2014, he scored a brace in a comfortable 4–0 win against Fostiras. On 24 February 2015, he opened the score in a 2–1 home win against Panachaiki. On 15 March 2015, he scored in a 3–1 away win against Fostiras. On 13 May 2015, he scored the only goal in a 1–0 away win against AEL. He finished the 2014–15 season with 9 goals and 8 assists in all competitions.

On 29 November 2015, he scored his first ever Superleague goal in a 2–0 home win against Panetolikos, after an assist from Rafik Djebbour.

It seems that the 28-year-old international, who joined the Greek Cup winners back in 2013 and his current contract expires at the end of 2016–17 season, will leave the club in January window in order to continue his career elsewhere.

Atromitos
On 28 December 2016, Platellas signed a 1,5 years' contract with fellow Greek club Atromitos for an undisclosed fee. On 18 February 2017, he opened the score in a 2–1 home win against Xanthi. On 31 August 2017, he solved his contract with the club.

Aris
On 11 September 2017, Platellas signed a one-year contract with Football League club Aris for an undisclosed fee. On 21 September 2017, thanks to a close-range effort by the international winger, Aris won 1–0 Panegialios on the road for 2017–18 Greek Cup. It was his first goal with his new club. On 28 October 2017, he scored in the season's opener, a 5–0 home win against Aiginiakos. On 19 November 2017, he scored a 90th-minute winner in a dramatic 3–2 away win against Ergotelis, after a catastrophic first half, which found his team being down by two goals. On 25 November 2017, Platellas was the MVP of a 2–1 home win against Panachaiki, scoring the equalizer and providing the assist to Georgios Delizisis for the winning goal. On 7 January 2018, he opened the score in a 2–0 home win against Apollon Pontou. On 18 February 2018, he scored in a 3–0 home win against Anagennisi Karditsa. A week later, he scored the second of four in a comfortable 4–1 away win against Aiginiakos. On 12 March 2018, he opened the score, with a penalty kick, in a 3–0 home win against Ergotelis.

OFI
On 23 June 2018, Platellas signed a one-year contract with OFI. On 9 December 2018, he scored his first goal for the club in an important 3–1 home win against Panathinaikos, only the second of the season.

On 12 January 2019, he opened the score in a 1–1 home draw against Panionios. On 20 January 2019, OFI accepted an offer in the region of €50,000 from Neftçi for the Greek winger. The Azerbaijani club is currently sitting on top of the league table and is looking for some quality players in the battle for the title.

Neftçi Baku
On 22 January 2019, Neftçi Baku officially announced the signing of the Greek winger until the summer of 2020 for an undisclosed fee.

International career
Platellas was called in to the Greece national football team by Kostas Tsanas for a UEFA Euro 2016 qualifier against Romania.

Honours

Club
AEK Athens
Football League: 2014–15 (South Group)
Football League 2: 2013–14 (6th Group)
Greek Cup: 2015–16
Ionikos
Super League Greece 2: 2020–21

Individual
Football League 2 Best Young Player of the Year: 2009–10

References

External links
 
 Insports profile 

1988 births
Living people
Greek expatriate footballers
Kallithea F.C. players
Xanthi F.C. players
AEK Athens F.C. players
Atromitos F.C. players
Aris Thessaloniki F.C. players
OFI Crete F.C. players
Neftçi PFK players
Athlitiki Enosi Larissa F.C. players
Ionikos F.C. players
Super League Greece players
Football League (Greece) players
Super League Greece 2 players
Azerbaijan Premier League players
Greek expatriate sportspeople in Azerbaijan
Expatriate footballers in Azerbaijan
Association football midfielders
Footballers from Athens
Greek footballers